The 1948–49 Iraq FA Kirkuk League was the first season of the Iraq FA Kirkuk League (the top division of football in Kirkuk from 1948 to 1973) organised by the Kirkuk branch of the Iraq Football Association. It started in November 1948 and finished in March 1949.

In the last round of the competition, Al-Dhahab Al-Aswad defeated Al-Firqa Al-Thaniya to effectively seal the title, since it meant Al-Athoreen needed to defeat Armenian Relief Corps by an unrealistic scoreline to overtake them on goal average (goals scored divided by goals conceded). Al-Athoreen drew their game meaning that Al-Dhahab Al-Aswad were crowned inaugural Iraq FA Kirkuk League champions.

League table
The last two results of the season (Al-Nahl IPC v. Al-Firqa Al-Thaniya and Ittihad Kirkuk v. Al-Madaris) are not available.

Known results

References

External links
 Iraqi Football Website

Iraq FA Kirkuk League seasons
Iraq
1948 in Iraq
1949 in Iraq